Aonghus Ruadh na nAor Ó Dálaigh, Irish poet, 1550–1617.

Ó Dálaigh was of the Muintir Bhaire sept, and lived at Balliorrone, County Cork.

He was employed by Sir George Carew and Mountjoy to lampoon the Irish chieftains and instigate enmity between them. The hostile reaction to his satire The Tribes of Ireland led to his assassination. According to Alice Curtayne:

He was survived by one son, Aonghus Óge Ó Dálaigh. Descendants of the family were still living in the area in the 1830s.

References
 The Irish Story: A Survey of Irish History and Culture Dublin, 1962, p. 91, Alice Curtayne.

External links
 Life of Aongus Ruadh Ó Dálaigh  Ricorso
 The Tribes of Ireland

Irish-language poets
16th-century Irish poets
17th-century Irish poets
People from County Cork